Coldwater River is the name of three streams in the U.S. state of Michigan:

 Coldwater River (Branch County)
 Coldwater River (Western Michigan)
 Coldwater River (Isabella County)

See also 
 Coldwater River (disambiguation)

Rivers of Michigan
Set index articles on rivers of Michigan